Dahua railway station is a railway station located in Pingxi District, New Taipei, Taiwan. It is located on the Pingxi line and is operated by the Taiwan Railways Administration.

References

1956 establishments in Taiwan
Railway stations opened in 1956
Railway stations in New Taipei
Railway stations served by Taiwan Railways Administration